This is a table of the number of recruits for the British Army during the First World War, 1914–1918.

All recruits were volunteers until January 1916, when men were recruited under the Derby Scheme and as conscripts following the Military Service Act 1916. From July 1917, all recruits were counted as Conscripts.

Sources
UK Parliamentary Papers, 1921 [Cmd. 1193] General Annual Reports on the British Army (including the Territorial Force) for the Period from 1st October, 1913, to 30th September, 1919.

United Kingdom in World War I
Conscription in the United Kingdom
British Army in World War I